Fire Island is an American reality television series from the LGBT-interest network Logo that began airing on April 27, 2017. It is produced by Kelly Ripa, Mark Consuelos, Albert Bianchini, and Lenid Rolov. The show was not renewed for a second season.

Synopsis
Six gay men share a beachfront house for the summer on Fire Island.

Cast
 Khasan Brailsford, a dancer and choreographer who has performed with artists like Beyoncé, Lady Gaga, P!nk, and Jennifer Lopez
 Jorge Bustillos, Khasan's best friend, a marketing strategist who left a career as a doctor in Venezuela
 Cheyenne Parker, an entrepreneur and model
 Justin Russo, an artist and illustrator
 Patrick McDonald, a Fire Island bartender
 Brandon Osorio, a New York University student and aspiring photographer

Production
Fire Island is produced by Kelly Ripa, Mark Consuelos, Albert Bianchini, and Lenid Rolov. Ripa and Consuelos said of the show, "We fell in love with Fire Island years ago the minute we stepped off the ferry. We’re excited to share the long-standing magic of the island with this new series and to be working again with our Logo family."

Logo ordered the series from Ripa and Consuelos in July 2016. Taped in Summer 2016, Fire Island cast members were announced on March 6, 2017. Saturday Night Live subsequently parodied the series in a skit about a lesbian reality show called Cherry Grove.

The beachfront house used in the series is located at 150 Ocean Front Walk in Fire Island Pines. The listing by Fire Island Properties describes it as "4 bedroom – 4 bath ocean front home is complete with 2 fireplaces, gunite pool and hot tub. All bedrooms have private bathroom." Per Newsday, the listing price for a July to August season in 2017 was $155,000.

Broadcast
A 90-second teaser trailer was released for Fire Island in on March 6, 2017. On March 14, 2017, Logo announced an April 27 premiere date for the series.

The first episode was previewed in the US on VH1 on April 21, 2017, at 9 pm after RuPaul's Drag Race. Fire Island premiered on Logo at 8 pm on April 27, 2017, with the first two episodes back-to back.

Reception
Following the release of a 90-second teaser for Fire Island, a March 2017 op-ed by personal trainer Jason Wimberly in The Advocate suggested that the series "contributes to gay America's moral decline" by glamorizing behavior that negatively impacts the perception of the LGBT community. Fire Island cast members defended the series, calling it "lighthearted" and noting that "we're not harming anyone", and cast members from MTV's controversial reality series Jersey Shore commented that "bad press is good press" and advised the Fire Island cast to "take the criticism with a grain of salt".

Episodes

References

External links

2017 American television series debuts
2017 American television series endings
2010s American reality television series
2010s American LGBT-related television series
American LGBT-related reality television series
Logo TV original programming
2010s LGBT-related reality television series